Corcoran Group is an American real estate firm founded in 1973 by Barbara Corcoran.

History 
Barbara Corcoran, a former diner waitress, founded her own real estate company in 1973 with a $1,000 loan. In 2001, Barbara Corcoran sold her company to NRT (later Realogy Brokerage Group and now Anywhere Real Estate) for $66 million.

References

External links 
 

Real estate services companies of the United States
Real estate companies established in 1973
Companies based in New York City
American companies established in 1973